The Bishop of Hong Kong may refer to the leaders of the following religious entities:

Roman Catholic Diocese of Hong Kong, established as a Prefecture Apostolic in 1841, as a Vicariate Apostolic in 1874, and as a Diocese in 1946
Orthodox Metropolitanate of Hong Kong and Southeast Asia, established in 1996

Anglican Communion
 Bishop of Victoria, the Ordinary of a corporation sole from 1849 to 1951
 The bishop for the Diocese of Hong Kong and Macao, an extraprovincial diocese from 1951 to 1998
 Hong Kong Sheng Kung Hui, 38th Province of the Anglican Communion since 1998, with three bishops for its three dioceses:
 Anglican Diocese of Hong Kong Island
 Anglican Diocese of Eastern Kowloon
 Anglican Diocese of Western Kowloon
 Archbishop of Hong Kong, leader of Hong Kong Sheng Kung Hui since its establishment in 1998, and Primate of Hong Kong and Macao